In mathematics, especially in the field of group theory, a divisible group is an abelian group in which every element can, in some sense, be divided by positive integers, or more  accurately, every element is an nth multiple for each positive integer n.  Divisible groups are important in understanding the structure of abelian groups, especially because they are the injective abelian groups.

Definition

An abelian group  is divisible if, for every positive integer  and every , there exists  such that . A third equivalent condition is that an abelian group  is divisible if and only if  is an injective object in the category of abelian groups; for this reason, a divisible group is sometimes called an injective group.

An abelian group is -divisible for a prime  if for every , there exists  such that .  Equivalently, an abelian group is -divisible if and only if .

Examples

 The rational numbers  form a divisible group under addition.
 Every quotient of a divisible group is divisible. Thus,  is divisible.
 The multiplicative group of the complex numbers  is divisible.
 Every existentially closed abelian group (in the model theoretic sense) is divisible.

Properties
 If a divisible group is a subgroup of an abelian group then it is a direct summand of that abelian group.
 Every abelian group can be embedded in a divisible group.
 Non-trivial divisible groups are not finitely generated.
 Further, every abelian group can be embedded in a divisible group as an essential subgroup in a unique way.
 An abelian group is divisible if and only if it is p-divisible for every prime p.
 Let  be a ring. If  is a divisible group, then  is injective in the category of -modules.

Structure theorem of divisible groups

Let G be a divisible group. Then the torsion subgroup Tor(G) of G is divisible. Since a divisible group is an injective module, Tor(G) is a direct summand of G. So

As a quotient of a divisible group, G/Tor(G) is divisible. Moreover, it is torsion-free. Thus, it is a vector space over Q and so there exists a set I such that

The structure of the torsion subgroup is harder to determine, but one can show that for all prime numbers p there exists  such that

where  is the p-primary component of Tor(G).

Thus, if P is the set of prime numbers,

The cardinalities of the sets I and Ip for p ∈ P are uniquely determined by the group G.

Injective envelope

As stated above, any abelian group A can be uniquely embedded in a divisible group D as an essential subgroup.  This divisible group D is the injective envelope of A, and this concept is the injective hull in the category of abelian groups.

Reduced abelian groups

An abelian group is said to be reduced if its only divisible subgroup is {0}. Every abelian group is the direct sum of a divisible subgroup and a reduced subgroup.  In fact, there is a unique largest divisible subgroup of any group, and this divisible subgroup is a direct summand. This is a special feature of hereditary rings like the integers Z: the direct sum of injective modules is injective because the ring is Noetherian, and the quotients of injectives are injective because the ring is hereditary, so any submodule generated by injective modules is injective.  The converse is a result of : if every module has a unique maximal injective submodule, then the ring is hereditary.

A complete classification of countable reduced periodic abelian groups is given by Ulm's theorem.

Generalization

Several distinct definitions generalize divisible groups to divisible modules. The following definitions have been used in the literature to define a divisible module M over a ring R:
 rM = M for all nonzero r in R. (It is sometimes required that r is not a zero-divisor, and some authors require that R is a domain.)
 For every principal left ideal Ra, any homomorphism from Ra into M extends to a homomorphism from R into M. (This type of divisible module is also called principally injective module.)
 For every finitely generated left ideal L of R, any homomorphism from L into M extends to a homomorphism from R into M.

The last two conditions are "restricted versions" of the Baer's criterion for injective modules. Since injective left modules extend homomorphisms from all left ideals to R, injective modules are clearly divisible in sense 2 and 3.

If R is additionally a domain then all three definitions coincide.  If R is a principal left ideal domain, then divisible modules coincide with injective modules. Thus in the case of the ring of integers Z, which is a principal ideal domain, a Z-module (which is exactly an abelian group) is divisible if and only if it is injective.

If R is a commutative domain, then the injective R modules coincide with the divisible R modules if and only if R is a Dedekind domain.

See also

 Injective object
 Injective module

Notes

References
 With an appendix by David A. Buchsbaum; Reprint of the 1956 original 

 
   Chapter 13.3.
 
 

 

Abelian group theory
Properties of groups